Mediolanum is the ancient name of Milan, Italy.

Mediolanum may also refer to:

Ancient Celtic cities and towns
 Mediolanum Santonum, modern Saintes in France
 Mediolanum Aulercorum, modern Évreux, France

 Mediolanum (Whitchurch), England
 Another British site placed by Ptolemy in central Wales and sometimes identified with,
 Meifod
 Llanfyllin
 Caersws

Other uses
 Gruppo Mediolanum, an Italian financial services group based in Basiglio near Milan
 Banca Mediolanum, an Italian bank
 Mediolanum (train), a name used for international express trains connecting to Milan
 Mediolanum (company), an Italian financial services company that merged with Banca Mediolanum in 2015
 Mediolanum Group, the current parent company of Banca Mediolanum